Star Trek: Of Gods and Men is a noncanonical, three-part, unofficial Star Trek fan miniseries, which contains many cast members from the Star Trek TV series and movies. Described by the producers as a "40th-anniversary gift" from Star Trek actors to their fans, it was filmed in 2006, but its release was delayed until 2007–08. It was not endorsed by the rights-holders of Star Trek, but has been covered on the official Star Trek website.

Plot

In 2305, a mysterious man (William Wellman Jr.) appears at a run-down outpost demanding the location of Captain James T. Kirk, only to find from the terrified data clerk (Ethan Phillips) that he was presumed dead saving the USS Enterprise-B 12 years earlier (at the opening of Star Trek Generations). Angrily declaring he "didn't wait 40 years to be cheated", the man overloads the outpost's systems, destroying it.

Meanwhile, Captain Nyota Uhura (Nichelle Nichols) attends the dedication of a new U.S.S. Enterprise (NCC-1701-M), a replica of the original 1701. It is designed as a museum ship and a tribute to all who served on the original Enterprise, especially to Captain Kirk's sacrifice, and is commanded by Kirk's nephew Peter (James Cawley). Uhura meets with Captains Pavel Chekov (Walter Koenig), head of Starfleet Security, and John Harriman (Alan Ruck), captain of the USS Enterprise-B, discussing old times and current events, including Chekov's delayed promotion to the admiralty. As they prepare to get underway, they receive a distress call from M-622, the planet housing the Guardian of Forever. Despite the fact the ship is a museum, the Enterprise-M is the closest to the location and sets a course; upon arrival, Uhura, Chekov, and Harriman beam to the surface. There, they meet the mysterious man from the outpost, revealed to be Charlie Evans, who had been encountered as a teenager with immense but uncontrolled mental powers during Kirk's first missions on the Enterprise. Imprisoned for four decades, Charlie is embittered by Kirk's decision to turn him over to the Thasians, and the fact that Kirk was lost in the Nexus 12 years earlier, before Evans could confront him. He decides to use the Guardian to alter the timeline and erase Kirk from history, by killing his mother before he was born.

Evans succeeds, and the timeline is altered beyond measure. The galaxy is governed by the Galactic Order, a militaristic state similar to the Terran Empire, but also including Klingons, Romulans, and Orions in their ranks. It is ruled over by a mysterious being known only as "Curate Prime", and uses ships from the era of the original series, but with state-of-the-art weaponry. Harriman is a brutal mass murderer in this timeline, commanding the G.S.S. Conqueror (GOC-1701), this timeline's analog to the Enterprise. The Conqueror pursues a rebel vessel and disables it, capturing the crew – revealed to be Chekov (under the nom de guerre "Kittrick") and his shape-shifting companion Ragnar (Gary Graham), who lead a movement of freedom fighters against the Galactic Order. Harriman orders them taken to the brig, and sets a course for Vulcan, which has declared neutrality. On Vulcan, Uhura is married to Stonn (Lawrence Montaigne) and has several children; upon learning of the Conquerors arrival, the Vulcans begin to evacuate the planet. Harriman summons Kittrick to the bridge to witness Vulcan's impending destruction for not supporting the Order, and unleashes an "Omega device" that destroys the entire planet.

While many of the fleeing Vulcan shuttles manage to escape, Uhura and her friend Tuvok (Tim Russ) are captured by the Conqueror and put in the brig with Kittrick and Ragnar. Through a meld with a mortally wounded Tuvok, Uhura recovers part of her memories of the old timeline, and convinces Kittrick (whom she knows by his original name) and Ragnar to help them escape and hijack the ship, taking it back to M-622 to use the Guardian and restore the timeline. Harriman is also needed alive, as he was part of the landing party when the timeline was altered, but Kittrick rages that Harriman murdered his family and destroyed his home, and that "Pavel Chekov" died that day. Regardless, Harriman is taken prisoner and transported to the surface with Kittrick and Uhura, where they again encounter a repentant Charlie Evans. Realizing the mistake in removing Kirk from the timeline, Evans restores the three's memories of their real timeline, while still keeping the memories of the altered timeline, as well. Evans at first refuses to help them restore the timeline, fearing the consequences; just then, the three are beamed back to the ship, where Koval (J. G. Hertzler), the Conquerors Klingon first officer, orders their executions, believing Harriman to have turned traitor. As Commander Garan (Garrett Wang) and his security officers take them to the conference room, Curate Prime (Daamen Krall) has a few "last words" with Kittrick before his impending execution, before ordering Garan to the bridge. As the security officers raise their weapons, one of them shoots his comrade, revealing himself to be Ragnar, who hid among the crew.

Uhura recognizes Curate Prime as Gary Mitchell, a friend of James T. Kirk's, who had been granted formidable mental power after passing through the galactic barrier 40 years earlier. Insanely believing himself a living god, Mitchell was defeated by Kirk in the real timeline; in the altered timeline, with Kirk not there to stop him, Mitchell was able to kill the captain of the Enterprise – in this case, Christopher Pike – and take control of the United Federation of Planets, refounding it as the Galactic Order. As they escape into the ship, a fleet of Kittrick's allies, led by Captain Galt (Herbert Jefferson Jr.) of the free ship Liberty, engages the Conqueror, with Curate Prime leading a fleet of his own to destroy Kittrick and his rebellion. While Chekov and Harriman take control of the Conqueror, Uhura transports to the surface. Mitchell follows her, believing her to be Chekov/Kittrick, and tortures her, demanding his location. Charlie Evans steps in to protect her, using his Thasian-granted powers to battle the god-like Mitchell. Beaten, Mitchell transports Janice Rand (Grace Lee Whitney) – the first woman Evans had ever met, when he was taken aboard the Enterprise – to distract him, letting off one last burst of energy before escaping to his flagship. Angered and weakened, Mitchell orders the firing of his ship's Omega device, which will destroy both the captured Conqueror and the planet.

On the surface, Uhura convinces Evans to set things right, while in orbit, the Conqueror is severely damaged and about to be destroyed by a warp-core breach. Harriman sets the ship on a collision course, but helm control fails, and the Conqueror begins to drift off course; Chekov separates the saucer, which would allow the warp-core explosion, to ram it into Mitchell's flagship. Reaching out to try to divert it, Mitchell finds his powers have disappeared, and as the Conquerors engineering section explodes, the shockwave sending the saucer right into the flagship; Mitchell screams Kittrick's name as his ship is destroyed. At the same moment, Evans goes through the Guardian and returns to the point where he visited the outpost and demanded to know where Kirk was. Waiting for Evans this time, instead of the data clerk, was his future self, who shoots him with a phaser. The timeline reverts to normal, and the landing party returns to the museum ship.

One year later, Uhura – motivated by her memories of the alternate timeline – marries Stonn on Vulcan. Chekov is at last promoted to admiral, while Harriman announces his intention to run for the Federation Council. Among the guests at the wedding is Janice Rand, who presents Chekov with a gift for his promotion – a tribble, which Rand assures him has been neutered. Uhura toasts the last 40 years of adventure, while Chekov toasts to the next 40, remarking that Spock always said there were possibilities.

Cast
 Walter Koenig as Captain Pavel Chekov / Kittrick
 Nichelle Nichols as Captain Nyota Uhura
 Alan Ruck as Captain John Harriman
 Garrett Wang as Commander Garan
 William Wellman Jr. as Charlie Evans
 J. G. Hertzler as Koval, a Klingon
 Gary Graham as Ragnar
 Tim Russ as Tuvok
 Chase Masterson as Xela, an Orion
 Daamen Krall as Gary Mitchell
 Crystal Allen as Conqueror Navigator Yara
 Ethan Phillips as Data Clerk
 Cirroc Lofton as Sevar, a Vulcan
 Lawrence Montaigne as Stonn
 James Cawley as Commander Peter Kirk (James T. Kirk's nephew)
 John Carrigan as Klingon Officer Kel'mag / G.S.S. Conqueror Klingon Officer
 Grace Lee Whitney  as Janice Rand
 Herbert Jefferson as Captain Galt
 Jeff Quinn as Conqueror Helmsman, a Romulan
 Arlene Martel as Vulcan Priestess
 Jack Donner as Wedding guest
 Tania Lemani as Wedding guest
 Celeste Yarnall as Wedding guest
 Bobby Quinn Rice as G.S.S. Conqueror Klingon Officer/Romulan Officer

Production
The series was directed by Tim Russ and conceived and produced by Sky Conway.  Best known for playing Tuvok on Star Trek: Voyager, Russ had directed one episode of that series. The series was shot on the Star Trek: New Voyages sets in Port Henry, New York. Scenes were also shot around the Los Angeles area, including at Vasquez Rocks, a popular site for Star Trek location footage. Scenes set at the Vulcan Science Academy were filmed in the San Fernando Valley. Principal photography began July 12, 2006, and finished in October 2006.

The series was produced with a budget of $150,000. Actors were paid according to SAG guidelines, but others involved in the making of the miniseries helped to produce it with little or no pay as "a labor of love".

Returning Star Trek cast and crew
The miniseries starred Nichelle Nichols as Nyota Uhura, Walter Koenig as Pavel Chekov, and Grace Lee Whitney as Janice Rand from the original series. Alan Ruck also reprised his role as Captain Harriman from Star Trek Generations, and Tim Russ appeared as Tuvok. Other regular Star Trek actors appeared in new roles, including Garrett Wang and Ethan Phillips (who respectively played Harry Kim and Neelix from Voyager), J. G. Hertzler, Cirroc Lofton, and Chase Masterson (Martok, Jake Sisko, and Leeta from Star Trek: Deep Space Nine), and Gary Graham (Ambassador Soval from Enterprise). The series was written by DS9 writers Jack Treviño and Ethan H. Calk. Douglas Knapp, the director of photography, had worked on Voyager.

Co-writer Jack Treviño explained how so many actors from the series had been willing to participate:   Executive producer Douglas Conway had tried to assemble more of the original series cast, but when George Takei (Hikaru Sulu) was not available, this led to the idea of including Ruck's character as captain.

Three actors from Star Trek: New Voyages, James Cawley, Jeff Quinn, and Bobby Quinn Rice (Kirk, Spock, and Peter Kirk), also featured.

Release dates
The press releases in July and October 2006 anticipated a Christmas 2006 release. On January 6, 2007, the first part of the series was announced as delayed until April.  This was to allow the three parts of the miniseries to be released closer together, with the second part following in May, and the third in June.

On April 15, 2007, the planned release date of part one, the official website announced that the release of the films had been delayed yet again. On October 31, 2007, the official website announced that part one would be released on December 22, 2007. On February 20, 2008, part two was announced to be released on March 15, 2008. On May 22, 2008,  part three was announced to be released on June 15, 2008.

In a May 2007 interview with Houston Chronicle blogger J. Kevin Tumlinson, director Tim Russ said the producers were attempting to distribute the project through current Star Trek franchise owner CBS, and if successful, they would sell the production as either a download or a DVD. The producers then clarified on the official forum that while "plans to release the series as a free download remain in place", licensing by CBS would be required for any versions for sale, e.g. DVDs.

In November 2008, Renegade Studios began giving free DVDs of the film as thank-you gifts to their online customers. As of December 2009, a new edition of the DVD with pop-up commentary trivia was being offered.

Reception
The film won the 2008 Best Web Production award from SyFy Portal.

Follow-up
Star Trek: Renegades, a series directed by Russ and with many others of the series team, was released on a nonprofit basis in 2015.

References

External links
 

 
 Behind the Scenes of Star Trek: Of Gods and Men Photo Essay
 STOGAM Soundtrack composed by Justin R. Durban

Of Gods and Men
Dystopian films
Films set in the 24th century